Wabash Township is one of twelve townships in Jay County, Indiana, United States. As of the 2010 census, its population was 578 and it contained 195 housing units.

History
The Grouping of Religious Buildings at Trinity was listed on the National Register of Historic Places in 1980.

Geography
The streams of Franks Drain, Loblolly Creek and Wilson Creek run through this township.

Unincorporated towns
 Jay City
 New Corydon
 Trinity

Cemeteries
The township contains one cemetery, Stevenson.

Major highways

Airports and landing strips
 Stolz Field

References
 U.S. Board on Geographic Names (GNIS)
 United States Census Bureau cartographic boundary files

External links
 Indiana Township Association
 United Township Association of Indiana

Townships in Jay County, Indiana
Townships in Indiana